Lucetta A. Elmer is an American politician and businesswoman serving as a member of the Oregon House of Representatives for the 24th district. Elected in November 2022, she assumed office on January 9, 2023.

Early life and education 
Elmer was born and raised in McMinnville, Oregon. She earned a Bachelor of Science degree in elementary education from Linfield University.

Career 
Elmer is the owner and managing partner of Douglas on Third, a boutique hotel. She also owns and operates Union Block Coffee. She was elected to the Oregon House of Representatives in November 2022.

References 

Living people
People from McMinnville, Oregon
People from Yamhill County, Oregon
Businesspeople from Oregon
Linfield University alumni
Oregon Republicans
Members of the Oregon House of Representatives
Women state legislators in Oregon